The Rule of the Major-Generals, was a period of direct military government from August 1655 to January 1657, during Oliver Cromwell's Protectorate. England and Wales were divided into ten regions, each governed by a major-general who answered to the Lord Protector.

The period quickly "became a convenient and powerful symbol of the military nature of the unpopular Interregnum state".

Policies
The Rule of the Major-Generals was set up by Cromwell by his orders to the army, and was not supported by parliamentary legislation. His goal was threefold: to identify, tax, disarm and weaken the Royalists, whom he saw as conspirators against his rule. The system was also an economical measure because the military budget had been cut. The major generals would take control of incumbent civilian administrations, which would not require an expansion of local military forces. As well, he sought "a reformation of manners" or moral regeneration through the suppression of vice and the encouragement of virtue, which he considered much too neglected. The historian Austin Woolrych, using 21st-century terminology, said that the Puritans did not consider it inappropriate to "employee senior military officers as vice squad chiefs".

In March 1655, there were ineffectual-but-concerted Royalist uprisings in England. In late July, news of the defeat of the expedition to Hispaniola, commanded by William Penn and Robert Venables, reached London in 1655. Cromwell felt that the defeat was his punishment from God for not trying to make England a more religious, godly place.

In August, a scheme was proposed to introduce the Rule of the Major-Generals, but prevarication and other delays delayed its introduction to October.

Like Cromwell, the Major Generals were committed Puritans, Congregationalist reformers with Calvinist leanings. Part of their job was to try to make England more godly. They clamped down on what they considered to be rowdy behaviour like heavy drinking, music, dancing and fairs. They also tried to stop Christmas celebrations. Their rule was unpopular.

The Second Protectorate Parliament voted down Major-General John Desborough's "Militia Bill" on 29 January 1657 by one hundred and twenty four votes to eighty eight. This bill would have perpetuated the Decimation Tax that funded the mounted militia, which was collected by Cromwell's Major-Generals; the failure of the bill caused the so-called rule of the Major-Generals in the counties to end.

The Rule of the Major General is regarded by a large number of authors as a military dictatorship, with the exception of Austin Woolrych. The argument of Woolrych against such definition is that the Major Generals remained within the boundaries of the law, they had minimal or no long-term influence in local government and their authority only lasted for less than two years.

Historical legacy
Patrick Little wrote an article on the  Major-General (2012) in the Oxford Dictionary of National Biography:

List
There were ten regional associations covering England and Wales administered by major-generals. Ireland, under Major-General Henry Cromwell, and Scotland, under Major-General George Monck, were in administrations that had already been agreed upon and were not part of the scheme.

Notes

References
 

 
 
 
 
 
 
 
 
 

Attribution:

 This article incorporates text from a publication under version 3.0 of the British Open Government Licence which is a Wikipedia compatible copyleft licence: 

English Civil War
Republicanism in England
1650s in England
1655 establishments in England
1655 in England
1656 in England
1657 in England
Former subdivisions of England
The Protectorate
Military dictatorships